Dromidea is a genus of beetles in the family Carabidae, containing the following species:

 Dromidea cyanoptera Fauvel, 1882
 Dromidea longiceps Fauvel, 1882
 Dromidea thomsoni Perroud & Montrouzier, 1864

References

Lebiinae